Scorn may refer to:

Comics
 Scorn, a comic created by Chris Crosby and Kevin Onofrio, published by SCC Entertainment
 Scorn, a comic book published by Septagon Studios, written by Kevin Moyers and David C. Hayes, with artwork by Philipp S. Neundorf

Fictional characters
 Scorn (DC Comics), an alias of Ceritak, a supporting character in Superman
 Scorn (Marvel Comics), a spawn of the character Carnage in Marvel Comics
 Scorn (The Batman), a character appearing in the television series The Batman
 Scorn, a dinobot in the Transformers universe
 The Scorn, an alien faction in the video game series Destiny

Films
 Scorn, a 2000 TV film directed by Sturla Gunnarsson
 Scorned, a 1994 film starring Shannon Tweed
 Scorned (2014 film)
 The Scorned, a 2005 film

Music
 Scorn (band)
 "Scorn", a B-side to the song "Glory Box" by Portishead

Other uses
 Scorn (video game), a horror video game
 Contempt, an emotion

See also
 A Woman Scorned (disambiguation)
 Sneer